About 200 TWh of energy in Bulgaria is consumed each year which is about 28 MWh per person, somewhat over the world average of 20 MWh. The largest sources are coal and oil, followed by nuclear.

Bulgaria does not produce much coal, oil and gas. Nuclear power produces 36% of Bulgaria's power, with the remaining 64% produced from fossil fuels, and without a domestic supply, the country is heavily dependent on imports for crude oil.

Economics
To improve the corporate management and supervision of the energy sector, on 13 February 2008 the Government of Bulgaria decided to set up a state-owned energy holding company Bulgarian Energy Holding, a successor of the state-owned 'Neft i Gas' (Oil and Gas) established in 1973. The holding company's business composes of subsidiaries operating in different energy sectors: electricity: Kozloduy nuclear power plant, Maritsa East 2 thermal power plant, NEK EAD and Elektroenergien sistemen operator (ESO); natural gas: Bulgargaz and Bulgartransgaz; coal mining: Mini Maritsa Iztok (Maritsa East mines).  The state holds a 100% stake in the holding company.

Energy prices are state controlled. Electricity is traded on the European market, and analysts suggest that more interconnectors should be built.

Coal
The government has committed to phase out coal by 2038 but some miners say that a just transition has not been planned. The country's nationally determined contribution to reduce greenhouse gas emissions from the power sector by 40% from 1990 to 2025 means low utilization of coal plants, and their need to buy EU Allowances and competition from renewables is expected to make them unprofitable. Burning coal for heating pollutes the air in cities.

Oil and natural gas

Bulgaria is believed to have extensive natural gas resources but due to a successful campaign against hydraulic fracturing does not, as of 2014, permit exploration or exploitation of this possibility. 

Bulgaria consumes about 3 billion cubic meters (bcm) of natural gas. The Gas Interconnector Greece-Bulgaria natural gas pipeline became operational in 2022, and will allow Bulgaria to receive about 1 bcm from Azerbaijan. 
The country imports over 90% of its natural gas from Russia via the Turk Stream pipeline under a 10-year contract, which is set to expire at the end of 2022. Due to the 2022 Russian invasion of Ukraine, Bulgaria's deputy prime minister Asen Vasilev on 19 March said that the country would not hold talks to renew the contract. In April 2022, it was announced that Russia will suspend sending gas supplies to Bulgaria and Poland, in exchange for their refusal to pay in roubles. In response to this, Bulgaria, is currently discussing importing liquefied natural gas through Turkey and Greece.

Most oil products are consumed by transport.

Power production

Bulgaria consumes about 35 TWh of electricity per year, and some is exported. The residential sector is the largest consumer, followed by industry then services.

Nuclear power

Bulgaria has the Kozloduy Nuclear Power Plant with two pressurized water reactors (together 2000 MW net). Four old and unsafe VVER-440/230 reactors (4 x 408 MW net) were taken off-line in 2004 and 2007). The two active reactors cover about a third of Bulgaria's electricity demand.

Coal power
Some power stations are very dirty, and in 2022 the European Commission was suing over excess sulphur dioxide air pollution. 

In early 2023 the government attempted to postpone Bulgaria’s EU commitment to reduce greenhouse gas emissions by 10% that year, because it did not want to close any coal-fired power stations.

Fossil fuel subsidy of coal power is expected to end by 2025. Bulgaria aims to phase out coal power (which is low quality lignite) by 2038 or earlier.

Gas power
In 2021 gas generated 6% of electricity.

Hydropower

Wind power

By the end of 2020 almost 1 GW of onshore wind power had been installed. It has been estimated that there is potential for at least another 2 GW by 2030.

Solar power 

By the end of 2020 about 1 GW of solar PV had been installed. It has been estimated that there is potential for at least another 4 GW by 2030.

Heating
More than a quarter of the population are estimated to be in energy poverty, as some buildings are not well insulated. Geothermal heating of some schools is being trialled. Burning wood and coal for home heating causes illness and death.

Energy transit
Russian gas from Turkstream transits to Serbia and Hungary.

See also

References

 
Bulgaria